College Heights Secondary School may refer to:

In Canada
 College Heights Secondary School (Prince George) in Prince George, British Columbia
 College Heights Secondary School (Guelph) in Guelph, Ontario